Diane Venora is an American stage, television and film actress. She graduated from the Juilliard School in 1977 and made her film debut in 1981 opposite Albert Finney in Wolfen. She won the New York Film Critics Circle Award for Best Supporting Actress for Bird (1988). Her other films include The Cotton Club (1984), Heat (1995), Romeo + Juliet (1996), The Jackal (1997), The Insider (1999) and Hamlet (2000).

Early life 
Venora was born in East Hartford, Connecticut, one of six children of Marie (née Brooks) and Robert P. Venora, who owned a dry-cleaning business. She graduated from East Hartford High School (class of 1970), where she was active in musicals and plays. She studied at Boston Conservatory of Music and two years later won a scholarship to Juilliard School in New York City, where she graduated in 1977. At Juilliard she was a member of the drama department's Group 6 (1973–1977), which included Kelsey Grammer, Harriet Sansom Harris and Robin Williams.

Career
After graduation, Venora performed extensively on the stage, particularly in Shakespearean plays. She made her film debut alongside Albert Finney and Gregory Hines in Wolfen (1981). In 1983, she starred in Joseph Papp's production of Hamlet at the New York Shakespeare Festival in the lead role, the first woman to play the role at the prestigious showcase.  She has a long history with Hamlet, having played the title role, as well as Ophelia opposite Kevin Kline, and Gertrude onscreen opposite Ethan Hawke.

In 1988, her critically acclaimed performance as Chan Parker in Clint Eastwood's Bird earned her a Golden Globe Award nomination and the New York Film Critics Circle Award. 

In 1994, after taking five years off to care for her daughter, Venora landed a starring role in the TV series Thunder Alley, followed by a recurring role as plastic surgeon Geri Infante in the TV series Chicago Hope.

In 1995 she starred opposite Al Pacino and Robert De Niro in Heat, earning high regard from critics and audiences for her portrayal of Justine Hanna, the Pacino character's troubled wife. Her other performances include Gloria Capulet [Juliet Capulet’s mother] in Romeo + Juliet (1996), The Jackal (1997), The 13th Warrior (1999), The Insider (1999), and All Good Things (2010).

Personal life
Venora was married to cinematographer Andrzej Bartkowiak in 1980; they divorced in 1989. That year, she took time off from show business to spend more time with her daughter Madzia, then eight. During her hiatus, Venora lived in New York City, teaching disadvantaged children and acting in an occasional play. In 1994, she and her daughter moved to Los Angeles.

Stage credits

Filmography

Film

Television

References

External links
 
 

Actresses from Connecticut
American film actresses
American stage actresses
American television actresses
Boston Conservatory at Berklee alumni
Juilliard School alumni
Living people
People from East Hartford, Connecticut
21st-century American women
American Shakespearean actresses
Year of birth missing (living people)